Hans Bauer (11 December 1903 – 30 December 1992) was a German cross-country skier. He competed in the men's 18 kilometre event at the 1928 Winter Olympics.

References

External links
 

1903 births
1992 deaths
German male cross-country skiers
Olympic cross-country skiers of Germany
Cross-country skiers at the 1928 Winter Olympics
People from Miesbach (district)
Sportspeople from Upper Bavaria